Thor is a given name. Notable persons with the name include:

 Thor Björgólfsson (born 1967), Icelandic entrepreneur
 Thor Bjørklund (1889–1975), Norwegian inventor
 Thor Nis Christiansen (1957–1981), American serial killer
 Thor Erdahl (born 1951), Norwegian painter
 Thor Falkanger (born 1934), Norwegian legal scholar
 Thor Fossum (1916–1993), Norwegian politician
 Thor Furulund (1943–2016), Norwegian painter
 Thor Gystad (1919–2007), Norwegian politician
 Thor Halvorssen (businessman) (1943–2014), Venezuelan-Norwegian businessman and ambassador
 Thor Halvorssen (human rights activist) (born 1976), Venezuelan human rights advocate and film producer
 Thor Hansen (born 1947), Norwegian poker player
Thor Harris (born 1965), American musician
 Thor Henning (1894–1967), Swedish swimmer
 Thor Heyerdahl (1914–2002), Norwegian explorer
 Thor Hushovd (born 1978), Norwegian road bicycle racer
 Thor Jensen (1889–1976), Norwegian gymnast
 Thor Knudsen (1927–2006), Norwegian politician
 Thor Kunkel (born 1963), German writer
 Thor Larsen (1886–1970), Norwegian gymnast
 Thor Lillehovde (born 1948), Norwegian politician
 Thor Longus (died 12th-century), Anglo-Saxon noble, active in Scotland
 Thor Lund (1921–1999), Norwegian politician
 Thor Munkager (1951–2017), Danish handball player
 Thor Myklebust (1908–1989), Norwegian politician
 Thor Nilsen (born 1931), Norwegian rower
 Thor André Olsen (born 1964), Norwegian footballer and trainer
 Thor Ørvig (1891–1965), Norwegian sailor
 Thor Pedersen (born 1945), Danish politician
 Thor Salden (born 1997), Belgian singer
 Thor Thorvaldsen (1909–1987), Norwegian sailor
 Thor Tjøntveit (1936–2017), Norwegian-American aviator
 Thor C. Tollefson (1901–1982), American politician
 Thor of Tranent ( 1127–1150), Scottish landlord and chieftain
 Thor Vilhjálmsson (1925–2011), Icelandic writer

Scandinavian masculine given names
Danish masculine given names
Icelandic masculine given names
Norwegian masculine given names
Swedish masculine given names
English masculine given names